WTCG (870 kHz) is an AM radio station licensed to Mount Holly, North Carolina, and serving the Charlotte metropolitan area. It is owned by Fiorini Broadcasting, LLC.  It is managed by Bible Clarity, based in Birmingham, Alabama.  WTCG has a Christian talk and teaching radio format.

By day, WTCG is powered at 5,000 watts, using a non-directional antenna.  Because 870 AM is a clear channel frequency reserved for WWL in New Orleans, WTCG must sign off at night.  WTCG's transmitter is off North Hoskins Road in Charlotte, near Interstate 85. Programming is heard around the clock on 250 watt FM translator W222CW at 92.3 in Charlotte.

History 

The radio station now at 870 kHz was previously licensed in Clayton, Georgia, but changed its city of license to Mount Holly, North Carolina, in 2009.  When the move occurred, the station moved from 250 watts of power on 1370 kHz to 5,000 watts of power on 870 kHz, the frequency formerly occupied by defunct radio station WGTL. The call sign changed from WGHC to WTCG.

WGHC was sold by Georgia-Carolina Radiocasting to Family First in a deal announced in 2008. Family First owner Linda de Romanett transferred the station's license from Family First to affiliate Bible Clarity on May 19, 2016.

References

External links 

TCG
Radio stations established in 1961
News and talk radio stations in the United States
1961 establishments in North Carolina
TCG